Patrick James Alexander (born December 23, 1978) is a former American football center. He was signed by the New Orleans Saints as an undrafted free agent in 2002. He played college football at Syracuse.

Alexander has also played for the Denver Broncos, Atlanta Falcons, Florida Tuskers and Omaha Nighthawks.

College career
Alexander played for four seasons at Syracuse University, where he started 23 games at left tackle in his final two years.

Professional career

Denver Broncos

Atlanta Falcons
In , Alexander joined the Atlanta Falcons, and made his first career start after two offensive linemen were hurt and suspended. However, the following week after the Baltimore Ravens game, Alexander lost his starting job, and was waived in 2007.

Second stint with Broncos
In , after injuries to Tom Nalen and Ben Hamilton, Alexander rejoined the Broncos.

Florida Tuskers
On August 17, 2009, Alexander was signed by the Florida Tuskers of the United Football League.

Omaha Nighthawks

References

External links
Just Sports Stats

1978 births
Living people
Sportspeople from Springfield, Massachusetts
Players of American football from Massachusetts
American football offensive tackles
American football offensive guards
American football centers
Syracuse Orange football players
New Orleans Saints players
Denver Broncos players
Atlanta Falcons players
Florida Tuskers players
Omaha Nighthawks players